Luzhou Township is a township under the administration of Shanggao County, Jiangxi, China. , it has one residential community and 11 villages under its administration.

References 

Township-level divisions of Jiangxi
Shanggao County